Occultammina is a genus of xenophyophorean foraminifera known from the Atlantic and Pacific oceans. It is notable for being the first known infaunal xenophyophore as well as for being a possible identity for the enigmatic trace fossil Paleodictyon.

Distribution and habitat 
Occultammina sp. has also been recovered at a depth of about  near the Clipperton Fracture Zone, off the coast of western Mexico.

It was the first known infaunal xenophyophore.

Occultammina is found at turbidite facies in today's oceans.

Description 
Occultammina is an exceptionally large single-celled organism; like other xenophyophores it constructs a complex, single-chambered shell or "test" from sediment particles. It grows in a net-like shape, the test consisting of hollow tubes that branch or form loose polygons. It is typically flattened compared to other xenophyophores. It also has vertically ascending tubular outlets. Occultammina tubes are similar to those of Tendalia in general shape, though the test structure differs.

The test wall typically ranges from 70-120 μm in thickness; it is poorly cemented and consists of two layers. The outermost is 15-30 μm in thickness and composed primarily from clay; the inner layer is 50-90 μm thick and composed of silt and radiolarian tests. The interior of the test lining has between one and four ridges separating the stercomares, or waste masses.

A specimen of Occultammina profunda was found to have unusually high levels of the radioactive isotopes Lead-210 (half-life=22.3 years), Polonium-210 (half-life=138.376 days) and Radium-226 (half-life=1600 years), specifically in the grannelare and stercomare, among the highest levels of Lead-210 recorded in any living organism. The authors suggest that the relative distribution of radionuclides in the organism's body parts implies that it grows and excretes comparatively rapidly.

Unfortunately no DNA samples have been collected from Occultammina, preventing further examination of its evolutionary relationships.

Relation to Paleodictyon 

The enigmatic "graphoglyptid" fossil Paleodictyon bears a passing resemblance to Occultammina, and this has led to suggestions of relationship between the two. Paleodictyon fossils are known from sediments interpreted as representing abyssal paleoenvironments associated with turbidite deposits, potentially lending credence to the hypothesis. Paleodictyon also preserves vertically ascending tubules that have been likened to those of Occultammina.

However, this relationship has been contested. The large size (up to ) of some Paleodictyon is unknown in modern Occultammina; the regular hexagonal pattern of Paleodictyon is similarly not represented in Occultammina. The apparent absence of collected sediment particles (known as xenophyae) in graphoglyptid fossils further casts doubt on the possibility.

Modern examples of Paleodictyon have been discovered; however, they have not been able to clear up the issue. Dissection of one specimen did not reveal tubes, mucus, protoplasm, or evidence of a test. Staining of a second specimen did not reveal soft-bodied evidence for xenophyophores such as stercomares or granellae;  some small agglutinated fragments were found that could have been from a psamminid, but this is not unexpected in deep-sea sediments. DNA analysis also did not reveal evidence of xenophyophores in the sample. The modern samples also lacked the barium concentration caused by the barite crystals in xenophyophore tests. This study suggested that Paleodictyon could represent a burrow system or a glass sponge.

References 

Foraminifera genera
Monothalamea
Xenophyophorea